Yevheniya Kravchuk (23 December 1985, Ternopil, Ukrainian SSR) is a Ukrainian politician, journalist and communication expert. She heads the press office of the Servant of the People political party. Kravchuk was elected to the Verkhovna Rada in 2019. 
She is Deputy Chairman of the Committee on Humanitarian and Information Policy since August 29, 2019.

Early life 
Yevheniya Kravchuk was born in Ternopil, Ukraine in a family of doctors.

She graduated from the Institute of Journalism of the Taras Shevchenko National University of Kyiv. Kravchuk is a graduate of the FLEX (Future Leaders Exchange Program) and she studied in the United States.

Kravchuk worked in management positions in analytical centers, in journalism. She was a producer and screenwriter in a documentary film (Serhii Bukovskyi's film Zhyvi). She was a partner in New Center Consulting. She also participated in the filming of the documentary Spell your name.

Kravchuk was a member of the organizing committee of the Odessa International Film Festival (2010—2014). She worked for the TA Venture fund.

Political activity 

She was the head of the press service of the UKROP party, communications director at the headquarters of the Strong Ukraine party and Serhiy Tihipko during the 2014 Ukrainian presidential elections.

In 2015, Kravchuk was a candidate for Kyiv City Council from the UKROP party.

She is a candidate from the Servant of the People party in the 2019 Ukrainian parliamentary elections, № 112 on the list.

Kravchuk is the Deputy Head of the parliamentary faction of the Servant of the People party.  She is also a Deputy Member of the Permanent Delegation to the Parliamentary Assembly of the Council of Europe.

In December 2019, she became a member of the Humanitarian Country Inter-Factional Association, created at the initiative of UAnimals to promote humanistic values and protect animals from cruelty.

References

External links 
Verkhovna Rada (in Ukrainian)

1985 births
Living people
Politicians from Ternopil
Ukrainian journalists
Servant of the People (political party) politicians
Ninth convocation members of the Verkhovna Rada
21st-century Ukrainian politicians